The Sagamok Anishnawbek First Nation, also known as Many Rivers Joining-Human Beings, is a First Nations band government located in Ontario, Canada. Sagamok's culture and language is Anishinabek and is made up of the Ojibwe, Odawa and Pottawatomi bands. The Sagamok occupy the Sagamok reserve approximately 120 kilometres west of Sudbury, Ontario, and have a population of approximately 1400.

In the early years of Canada's development, the French relied on Sagamok's strategic location to trade with the local Anishnaabe people of that time. The French base of operations was the nearby Fort La Cloche.

See also
Kenjgewin Teg Educational Institute

References

External links
First Nation Community Profile
Assessment Study of Water and Wastewater Management Systems, March 7, 2001

First Nations governments in Ontario